Perín-Chym is a municipality (village) in eastern Slovakia near the town of Košice.

It arose in 1964 by a merger of the municipalities Perín (first written mention 1220; before 1927 called Perina) and Chym (first written mention 1294; also called Him in some periods in the past). The municipality Vyšný Lanec was merged with Perín-Chym in 1991.

The village Perín gave name to the Lords of Perín (Perényi), a noble family in the Kingdom of Hungary, whose oldest known member Urban was granted the domain of Perín in 1292.

Today the municipality is well-known thanks to ponds and fishery.

Statistics
 Mayor: Adriena Baranová
 Website
 Population: 1,496
 Region: Košice Region
 District: Košice-okolie District

Villages in Slovakia